"Any Emotions" is a single by American band Mini Mansions, featuring Brian Wilson. Released on January 13, 2015, it is the second single released in promotion for the band's second LP The Great Pretenders. Wilson's involvement came after bassist Zach Dawes connected with him during the recording of No Pier Pressure. According to Dawes:

In interviews, the band has explained the song is a reference to singer Michael Shuman's struggles with Asperger's Syndrome.

The vinyl single was initially mispressed with the tracks from Boston hardcore punk band Siege's Lost Session '91 7".

References

2015 songs
2015 singles
Mini Mansions songs
Capitol Records singles
Brian Wilson